House of Life is a 1952 West German drama film directed by Karl Hartl and starring Gustav Fröhlich, Cornell Borchers and Edith Mill. The film's setting is a maternity hospital, portraying the stories of various staff and patients.

It was made at the Bavaria Studios in Munich. The film's sets were designed by Franz Bi and Botho Hoefer.

Cast
 Gustav Fröhlich as Dr. Peter Haidt
 Cornell Borchers as Dr. Elisabeth Keller
 Edith Mill as Oberschwester Hedwig
 Viktor Staal as Willi Kuschitzky
 Hansi Knoteck as Else Kuschitzky
 Judith Holzmeister as Inge Jolander
 Curd Jürgens as Axel Jolander
 Gertrud Kückelmann as Christine
 Edith Schultze-Westrum as Josepha Spratt
 Petra Unkel as Grit Harlacher
 Elfriede Kuzmany as Frau Frey
 Paula Braend as Frau Wilk
 Claire Reigbert as Schwester Sophie
 Franz Muxeneder as Hense
 Erich Ponto as Geheimrat Merk
 Hans Leibelt as Portier Kögl
 Joachim Brennecke as Kurt Baumann
 Karlheinz Böhm as Pit Harlacher
 Hans Hermann Schaufuß as Vater Harlacher
 Rudolf Schündler as Dr. Blümel
 Viktor Afritsch as Dr. Billich
 Fritz Rasp as Der Verführer

References

Bibliography 
 Hans-Michael Bock and Tim Bergfelder. The Concise Cinegraph: An Encyclopedia of German Cinema. Berghahn Books, 2009.

External links 
 

1952 films
1952 drama films
German drama films
West German films
1950s German-language films
Films directed by Karl Hartl
Films based on German novels
Films set in hospitals
German pregnancy films
Bavaria Film films
Films shot at Bavaria Studios
German black-and-white films
1950s German films